Charles Duncan Drain (January 24, 1913 – January 27, 1991) was a politician from Alberta, Canada. He served in the Legislative Assembly of Alberta from 1967 to 1975 as a member of the Social Credit caucus in both government and opposition.

Political career
Drain first ran for a seat to the Alberta Legislature in the 1967 general election. He defeated incumbent MLA Garth Turcott to pick up the Pincher Creek-Crowsnest electoral district for the governing Social Credit party.  In the 1971 general election he defeated two other candidates. In the 1975 general election his share of the popular vote fell sharply and he was defeated by Progressive Conservative candidate Fred Bradley.

References

External links
Legislative Assembly of Alberta Members Listing

Alberta Social Credit Party MLAs
1913 births
1991 deaths
American emigrants to Canada